The Call of Cthulhu and Other Weird Stories is Penguin Classics' first omnibus edition of works by seminal 20th-century American author H. P. Lovecraft. It was released in October 1999 and is still in print. The volume is named for the Lovecraft short story, "The Call of Cthulhu".

This edition, the first new paperback publication of Lovecraft's works since the Del-Rey editions, contains a new introduction and explanatory notes on individual stories by noted Lovecraft scholar S. T. Joshi. The texts of the stories are, for the most part, the same corrected versions found in the earlier Arkham House editions of Lovecraft's works, also edited by Joshi, with a few further errors corrected for the present editions.

Its companion volumes from Penguin Classics are The Thing on the Doorstep and Other Weird Stories (2001), and The Dreams in the Witch House and Other Weird Stories (2004).

Contents
The Call of Cthulhu and Other Weird Stories contains the following tales:

 Dagon
 The Statement of Randolph Carter
 Facts Concerning the Late Arthur Jermyn and His Family
 Celephaïs
 Nyarlathotep
 The Picture in the House
 The Outsider
 Herbert West -- Reanimator
 The Hound
 The Rats in the Walls
 The Festival
 He
 Cool Air
 The Call of Cthulhu
 The Colour Out of Space
 The Whisperer in Darkness
 The Shadow Over Innsmouth
 The Haunter of the Dark

References

External links
 Penguin Classics' page for the collection

All of the stories collected in this edition can also be found at Wikisource. Scholars should note that the texts transcribed on Wikisource may contain errors, or may represent "uncorrected" versions.

1999 short story collections
Cthulhu Mythos anthologies
Short story collections by H. P. Lovecraft